Srikanth is an Indian actor known for his works predominantly in Tamil and Telugu films. He is credited as Sriram in Telugu films. He debuted in K. Balachander's tele serial Jannal - Marabu Kavithaigal (1999). His film debut was in the romantic film Roja Kootam (2002) and went on to star in more such films including April Maadhathil (2002), Parthiban Kanavu (2003) and Okariki Okaru (2003). He subsequently went on to portray action roles in  Drohi (2010). In 2012, he starred in Nanban, the Tamil remake of 3 Idiots, directed by S. Shankar.

Personal life
Srikanth was born to a Telugu-father (from Chittoor) and Tamil-mother (from Kumbakonam) in Chennai. His family hailed from Tirupati and he was raised in Hyderabad. His father worked in State Bank of India. Srikanth had an elder brother who died due to dengue after he returned from United States. Srikanth uses the name Sriram in Telugu films to avoid ambiguity with his contemporary Srikanth.

He married Vandana on 7 September 2008, who had completed her MBA in Australia. The couple has two children.

Career

2002-2009: Debut and breakthrough
Looking to step into an acting career after beginning as a model, Srikanth was coached acting skills by then-assistant directors such as Vetrimaaran and Mysskin in the early 2000s. Srikanth was selected to play the lead role in Kathir's Kadhal Virus (2002) and spent a year preparing for the film, before being replaced by fellow newcomer Richard. He was then considered to make his acting debut through Jeeva's 12B, but the role went to another newcomer Shaam. Further potential projects directed by Bharathiraja and K. Balachander also did not work out, before he was cast by Sasi in Roja Kootam (2002), after the original lead actor had opted out. After the film's success, he became popularly known as Roja Kootam Srikanth for a while.

Srikanth then featured in another successful venture April Madhathil (2002) alongside Sneha followed by Manasellam (2003). He won the Tamil Nadu State Film Award Special Prize for his role in Parthiban Kanavu (2003), directed by Karu Pazhaniappan. Srikanth's straight Telugu film was Rasool Ellore's directorial debut Okariki Okaru under the stage name of Sriram to avoid confusion with established star Meka Srikanth. The film received positive reviews upon release with one critic noting that "He did a sensible portrayal of the role". His first release of 2004 was Varnajalam, followed by Bose, in which he was paired with Sneha for the second time after April Maadhathil. Kana Kandaen (2005) directed by K. V. Anand, with the Malayalam actor Prithviraj in his first Tamil role. Srikanth and Prithviraj gave a good performance also. The film was followed by Oru Naal Oru Kanavu (2005) and Bambara Kannaley (2005). In 2006, he acted in the film Mercury Pookkal, and Uyir. Behindwoods wrote: "Sri has come up with an excellent performance of a man lost in this juggernaut of emotions." TSV Hari at Rediff.com responded negatively to Kizhakku Kadalkarai Salai, noting a thin script and "meaningless songs". This was the third film and last collaboration between the director S. S. Stanley and Srikanth after April Maadhathil and Mercury Pookkal. His next film was Aadavari Matalaku Arthale Verule, a Telugu film directed by Tamil director Selvaraghavan. Srikanth play the second lead role after Telugu actor Venkatesh Daggubati. This was followed by Vallamai Tharayo (2008), Poo (2008) and Indira Vizha (2009).

2010-2017: Setbacks and success

In 2010, Srikanth released Rasikkum Seemane, Police Police and Drohi. Srikanth co-starring with the new Tamil actor Vishnu Vishal in this film. Mandhira Punnagai was last released in guest appearance. In 2011, he began in Malayalam film Uppukandam Brothers: Back in Action, a Telugu film, Dhada and Sadhurangam. The film was completed in 2006 but the film remained unreleased for five years. The project was released on 7 October 2011. These three movies was a box office failure. In 2012, he was first seen in S. Shankar's comedy-drama Nanban, which featured him as part of an all-star cast including Vijay, Jiiva, Ileana D'Cruz and Sathyaraj. The movie is released to highly positive reviews. It was dubbed and released in Telugu as Snehitudu. He also started in Telugu film Nippu (2011), a Malayalam film Hero (2012) and comedy film Paagan (2012). Later, he acted in Buddy (2013) and Kathai Thiraikathai Vasanam Iyakkam (2014) as guest appearance directed by R. Parthiepan. In 2015, he played in the supernatural drama film Om Shanthi Om. The following year, he acted in the horror film Sowkarpettai (2016) and comedy Nambiyaar (2016). In 2017, he appeared in the Telugu action thriller Lie.

2019-present
In 2019, his next movie was Rocky: The Revenge, a Tamil action crime thriller centered on dogs. The film was a box office failure. He also appeared in the Telugu film Raagala 24 Gantallo (2019), where he played the cop.

Awards 
 ITFA Best New Actor Award for Roja Kootam (2002)
 Tamil Nadu State Film Special Award for Best Actor for Parthiban Kanavu (2003)
 Kalaimamani Award from the Government of Tamil Nadu (2018)

Filmography

Film

Television

Notes

References

External links
 

Telugu people
Tamil people
Male actors in Tamil cinema
Living people
Male actors in Malayalam cinema
Male actors in Telugu cinema
Indian male film actors
Tamil Nadu State Film Awards winners
Male actors from Chennai
21st-century Indian male actors
Year of birth missing (living people)